Dunérbukta is a bay at the western shore of Storfjorden in Sabine Land at Spitsbergen, Svalbard. It is named after Swedish astronomer Nils Christoffer Dunér. The glacier of Ulvebreen debouches into the bay. At the northern side of the bay is the mountain of Domen and the ridge Kapp Johannesen.

See also
Dunérfjellet
Kapp Dunér

References

Bays of Spitsbergen